Sonerien Du is a group of Breton music adapted for the dances in Fest Noz. The group was born in 1972, in Alan Stivell's trail, harpist of the Celtic Revival. Driving force of the Breton culture, the group crossed periods of concerts and festoù-noz, with a traditional and modern music at the same time, always respecting dance. It recorded 20 albums over 40 years.

History 
...

Discography 
 1972: Breton Ball
 1974: Breton Ball vol. 2
 1976: Sonerien Du vol. 3
 1978: Gwerz Penmarc'h
 1980: Feunteun an aod
 1982: Ten Years
 1984: Roue marc' h
 1986: Amzer Glaz
 1988: Tradition vibrante
 1989: Tredan
 1992: Etre Mor ha Douar
 1994: Puzzle
 1996: Reder Noz
 1998: Steïr
 2000: Noz-Live (concert)
 2002: Le bel âge... ("The Beautiful Age...")
 2004: Puzzle 2
 2006: Be new!
 2008: Liv an Amzer
 2010: La Komplèt'''
 2011: Live 2011 2012: Seizh 2012: Live'niversaire (40 years)
 2013: Puzzle 2 2014: Live Brodeuses 2014 2015: Frankiz 2017: 45 Ans De Fiesta (Live) 2019: Kalon''

References

External links

 Official site

Musical groups established in 1972
Breton musical groups
Breton-language singers